Mykyta Anatoliyovych Turbayevskyi (born 12 March 2002) is a Ukrainian professional football goalkeeper who plays for Shakhtar Donetsk.

Career

Shakhtar Donetsk
Born in Donetsk, Turbayevskyi is a product of the local Shakhtar Donetsk youth sportive school system. In 2019, Turbayevskyi was named "Goalkeeper of the Tournament" in the CEE Cup. He played in the Ukrainian Premier League Reserves and never made his debut for the senior Shakhtar Donetsk's squad.

Loan to Mariupol
In July 2021, Turbayevskyi signed one year loan contract with the Ukrainian Premier League's side Mariupol and made the debut for this team as the start squad player in the away winning match against FC Volyn Lutsk on 22 September 2021 in the Round of 32 of the Ukrainian Cup. One month later, he made his debut in the Ukrainian Premier League as the start squad player in the home match against FC Dynamo Kyiv on 30 October 2021.

Career statistics

References

External links
 
 

2002 births
Living people
Footballers from Donetsk
Ukrainian footballers
Ukrainian expatriate footballers
FC Shakhtar Donetsk players
FC Mariupol players
NK Lokomotiva Zagreb players
FC Zorya Luhansk players
Association football goalkeepers
Ukrainian Premier League players
Croatian Football League players
Ukraine youth international footballers
Ukraine under-21 international footballers
Expatriate footballers in Croatia
Ukrainian expatriate sportspeople in Croatia